Tak is a Dutch, English, Indian, and Korean surname.

Origins
The Dutch surname Tak originated both from the Dutch-language word  "tree branch", and as a diminutive of the Germanic given name Theuderic.

As an English surname, Tak is a historical spelling of Tagg, which originated in a variety of ways, including as a diminutive of various Germanic names starting with Dag- (e.g. Dagobert), and as a nickname possibly from Middle English  "tatter" (referring to a person wearing tattered clothes) or from Old French  "belt buckle". One early record of a person with a surname spelled Tak is Hugo Tak of Rushden, Northamptonshire, in the Poll Tax of 1379.

Tak is also a variant spelling of the Indian surname Taunk.

The Korean surname spelled Tak in the Revised Romanization of Korean is written with the hanja  ( 탁), meaning "lofty" or "outstanding". The same character is used to write the Chinese surname now pronounced Zhuó in Mandarin Chinese. The major bon-gwan (clan hometown) for people with this surname is Gwangsan, Gwangju. See Gwangsan Tak clan.

Statistics
In the Netherlands, there were 1,579 people with the surname Tak in 2007, up from 1,203 in 1947. The largest numbers of bearers of the surname were found two municipalities in North Brabant in the Southern Netherlands: Halderberge (191 people) and Roosendaal (139 people).

The 2000 South Korean census recorded 19,395 people in 6,023 households with the surname spelled Tak in the Revised Romanization of Korean. Of these, 17,322 people in 5,381 households identified their clan's  as Gwangsan or Gwangju, and 1,368 people in 433 households as Gapyeong, while the remaining 705 people in 209 households identified other places as their  or did not state their . Bearers of this surname usually but not always choose to spell it as Tak in the Latin alphabet. In a study by the National Institute of the Korean Language based on year 2007 application data for South Korean passports, it was found that 73.6% of people with that surname spelled it in Latin letters as Tak in their passports. Rarer alternative spellings included Tag, Taek, and Tark.

The 2010 United States census found 854 people with the surname Tak, making it the 28,856th-most-common surname in the country. This represented an increase from 653 people (33,054th-most-common) in the 2000 census. In both censuses, more than eight-tenths of bearers of the surname identified as Asian, and about one-tenth as non-Hispanic white.

People
Pieter Lodewijk Tak (1848–1907), Dutch journalist and politician
Tak In-suk (born 1949), North Korean speed skater
Ad Tak (born 1953), Dutch cyclist
Bibi Dumon Tak (born 1964), Dutch writer of children's literature
Tak Jung-im (born 1967), South Korean fencer
Tak Jae-hoon, stage name of Bae Sung-woo (born 1968), South Korean singer
Tak Jae-in, South Korean voice actor
Paul-Peter Tak, Dutch immunologist
Mahinder Tak, American radiation oncologist and retired US Army colonel of Indian descent
Meng Heang Tak, Cambodian-born Australian politician

References

Dutch-language surnames
Indian surnames
Korean-language surnames
Surnames of English origin